Tiberius Aemilius Mamercus was a Roman senator active in the fifth century BC. He was consul in 470 and 467 BC.

Family
Mamercus was a member of the Aemilii Mamerci, a branch of the gens Aemilia. He was the son of Lucius Aemilius Mamercus, consul in 484, 478, and 473 BC, and the grandson of a Mamercus Aemilius.

Biography
In 470 BC, Mamercus was elected consul with Lucius Valerius Potitus Publicola as his colleague. The political situation in Rome was strained; the tribunes of the plebs continued to demand that land be distributed equally to the people.  Livy states that Mamercus argued in favour of land distributions to the plebs.  Tribunes Marcus Duillius and Gnaeus Siccius prosecuted Appius Claudius Sabinus, who was bitterly opposed to their legislation that distributed land to the people, however he died before the proceedings ended.  

The Aequi and the Sabines, taking advantage of the internal conflict in Rome, raided Roman territory. Potitus was sent to fight the Aequi, while Mamercus fought a campaign against the Sabines. The Sabines confined themselves to their camp and would not engage the Roman army.  Mamercus laid waste the Sabine countryside and also their villages, prompting the Sabines to come forth to stop him.  The resulting battle was not definitive with both sides retreating.  The war between the Romans and the Sabines continued in the following years.

Mamercus was elected consul a second time in 467 BC, with Quintus Fabius Vibulanus as his colleague. Mamercus again supported the agrarian law of the plebeian tribunes in favour of a distribution of land to the people and was confronted by the conservative senators. With his colleague Vibulanus, he successfully bought an end to the conflict by passing a law that the lands of the Volsci at the new Roman colony of Antium be distributed. Three commissioners were named for the purpose of dividing the lands.

Mamercus launched another military expedition against the Sabines while his colleague fought the Aequi. Mamercus could not provoke a definitive battle, despite extensive pillaging of Sabine territory.

Notes

Bibliography

Primary sources
 Dionysius of Halicarnassus, Roman Antiquities, Book IX
 Livy, The History of Rome, Books II-III

Secondary sources
 

5th-century BC Roman consuls
Mamercus, Tiberius